Ariel Moscovici (born 1956, Bucharest, Romania) is a sculptor born in Romania and based in France. His drawings and sculptures have appeared in France at Salons de Mai, Grands et Jeunes d'aujourd'hui, Salon des Réalités Nouvelles, 33rd Salon de la Jeune Sculpture, 3Oth Salon de Montrouge, and others. Internationally, his work has been the subject of exhibits and installations in Andorra, Spain, Belgium, Germany, Luxembourg, Korea, Taiwan and Japan. Moscovici works have been awarded first prize at the Biennale Internationale de Sculpture Contemporaine, Collioure and purchase awards from the Taipei Fine Arts Museum in Taiwan. Moscovici's public art work Between Sky and Earth, was installed at Taipei 101 in 2003.

Born in Bucharest, Romania, Moscovici graduated in 1979 from L'École nationale supérieure des Beaux-Arts (ENSBA) in Paris. He now lives in the south of France. He is married to French sculptor Sylvie Rivillon.

Style

Moscovici, normally reluctant to discuss art in words, has in recent years offered a few written comments for exhibit programs. His remarks include the following observations.

In my work I use mostly what may be called classical materials (stone, wood, clay, bronze, metal. etc.) because these are almost abstract and amorphous. Their identity resides mainly in their structure (except for metal). This allows me to model them the way I want while respecting their character.

I want to realize what I call "inhabited forms"--forms that contain energy, as if they could breathe and live by themselves. This is a personal attitude of mine, both classical and modern, as I don't wish to be part of any official fashion or artistic movement.

My subjects have no clear borders. They are connected to each other. My basic themes: nature; landscapes that accommodate and oppose human creation; an architecture of the "spirit"; skeletons and enveloping skin; the evocation of a feeling or a sound or a privileged location; landscapes with flat areas and mountains, rough or modelled, with erosion that is natural or artificial, accomplished by nature or man.

I am lately working on a series of variations on a theme. In Between Three Points [2000] I explored the idea of reading a sculpture in time, as in a  work of music. The work is built from three pieces that... tell the story of the creation of a form in three chapters: (1) the beginning, birth, or underground level, (2) the initiation, or earth ground level, and (3) the rebirth or result tending toward the sky. The form is not completely free to grow as it will, but is constrained and guided by internal tectonic pressures and external atmospheric pressures. The sculpture can be read in two directions at the same time: horizontally between the three parts and vertically between the ground and the sky....

In Between Earth and Sky [2002] the idea is the same but expressed more in the vertical direction. We have axels between two points, places where passage can take place. The axels stand as almost human figures between the matter and spirit, between the underground (hell) and the sky....

The surface of my forms is worked in the same way: smooth areas in opposition to rough ones and simple, almost geometrical, forms facing multifaceted, chaotic accumulations of shapes. Simplicity strikes me as dangerous. It's wrong to try to understand things by eliminating the details instead of understanding the whole in its complexity. I think the details create the whole.

Moscovici's images, though modern, may be described as postmodernist in the sense that they are more archetypal than abstract. Raymond Crampagne describes their effect in a publication by the Chateau le Puget Art Gallery:

The works are not a reflection of geometrical forms in a timeless space. They have a temporal dimension relating not to history or mythology but to a world that existed before both; even so, this world forms the essence of both history and myth. This is a world constantly engaged in struggle. The protagonists in the conflict, humanity and nature, operate in a world of opposites: smooth and rough, gloss and matte, geometrical and irregular, concave and convex, straight and curved, round and square, polished and rough, full and empty, imprint and excrescence, horizontal and vertical, mass and surface.  For Moscovici this conjunction of opposites is characteristic of our species' relationship with nature. Though we are ourselves part of nature, we exert our will over matter and impose our own vision, eventually transforming nature to reflect our innermost being.

Like Rimbaud seeking to write the silences, seize the inexpressible, and freeze whirlwinds, Moscovici seeks to translate into images the fundamental rhythms of existence and the mysteries of nature.... 

Moscovici displays a profound humanism whose expression is anything but extravagant. The means are simple. The eye and the spirit are called inward. ... Here one is facing an uninhabited habitat, a dwelling lacking practical purpose. Only the eye of the beholder will enter and find refuge and, in solitude, dream of habitation.

(Translation: Robert Drew, Jacques Carrio, Alton Thompson)

Installations and exhibits

One-Artist Shows

1985
Galerie du Haut-Pavé, Paris, France
The International Art Fair, Lahumière gallery, Basel, Switzerland
Maison de la Culture, Courbevoie, France

1986
Galerie du Soir, Paris, France

1987
Espace Gambetta, Carcassonne, France
MAC 2000, Grand Palais, Paris, France

1989
Galerie d'Art Contemporain, Chamalières, France

1990
Pierre-Marie Vitoux Gallery, Paris, France
Espace Gauthier, Narbonne, France

1991
SAGA (International Multiple Art Fair), Triskel Gallery, Paris, France
LINEART, International Art Fair, Ghent (Belgium), Triskel Gallery, Ghent, Belgium

1992
Naito gallery, Nagoya, Japan
Pierre-Marie Vitoux gallery, Paris, France
SAGA (International Multiple Art Fair), Pierre-Marie Vitoux Gallery, Paris, France
Espace Cardin, Triskel Gallery, Paris, France
MAC 2000, Grand Palais, Paris, France

1993
Era Bauro Gallery, Andorra
Michele Guerin Gallery, Limetz, France

1994
TRISKEL Gallery, LINEART International Art Fair, Gent, Belgium
Michele Guerin Gallery, Bonnières, France

1995
SAGA (Internationale Multiple Art Fair), Michel Guerin Gallery, Paris, France
Pierre Marie Vitoux Gallery, Paris, France

1996
SAGA (International Multiple Art Fair), Michel Guerin Gallery, Paris, France
"Print & Drawing" Co-op, Kyoto, Japan

1999
Pilar Riberaygua Gallery, Andorra
NICAF. Nagoya art fair. Naitoh Gallery, Japan
Pierre Marie Vitoux Gallery, Paris
Michele Guerin  Gallery, Limetz, France

2000
Maison Du Roi, Sigean
Maria Villalba Gallery, Barcelona, Spain

2001
"Chemins Paralleles, two artistes, Gallery Mssohkan, Kobe,  Japan
Gallery Miyabi, Nagoya, Japan
Gallery Chisai Oyorokobi, Oono, Japan
Two artistes, Le Puget Castle, Alzonne, France

2002
Maria Villalba Gallery, Barcelona, Spain

2003
Two artistes, Art is Long Gallery, Kyoto, Japan
Two artistes, Today's Gallery, Ozu, Japan
Two artistes, Miyabi Gallery, Nagoya, Japan

2004
Castan Gallery,  Perpignan, France
"Art Paris", Gallery Maria Villalba, Paris Art Fair, France

2005
Maria Villalba Gallery,  Barcelona, Spain
Michele Guerin Gallery, Limetz, France

2006
Maison du Chevalier Gallery, Carcassonne, France

2007
Karlsruhe Art Fair, Gallery Villalba, Germany
KIAF,  Seoul Art Fair, Gallery Adriana Schmidt, Korea
Two artistes, Gallery Naofu, Gifu, Japan
Two artistes, Miyabi Gallery, Nagoya, Japan

Group Exhibits

1985
Visages contemporains de la sculpture en Europe
Sculpture International Exhibition, Maubeuge museum
Cultural Center, Boulogne-Billancourt

1987
Jardin de sculptures, Chateauvert

1988
Toromania, CIECLE, Gerard Laubie foundation, Massillaugues
Couleurs de France, Espace AGF, Paris, France

1990
Points de vue, sculptures, Pierre-Marie Vitoux gallery, Paris, France

1992
Pestalozzi Gallery (Era-Bauro), Berlin, Germany
Multiple Art Fair,  Adriana Schmidt gallery, Düsseldorf, Germany
Graphic Arts Fair, Adriana Schmidt gallery, Barcelona, Spain

1993
Vientos del Este, MAEGHT Gallery, Barcelona, Spain
15 Sculptors, Simoncini Gallery, Luxembourg
Maison du Chevalier Symposium, Carcassonne, France

1994
Gioia Lazzarini, Pietrasanta, Italy
Trajectes I Convergencies, Morerra museum,  Lleida, Spain
Verticales, Pierre Marie Vitoux Gallery, Paris, France

1995
Trajectes I Convergencies, National Gallery, Andorra
4 Artistes, Era-Bauro Gallery, Andorra
Group Show, Duchamp Gallery, Kaohsiung, Taiwan
Group Show, Color Field Art Space, Taipei, Taiwan
Simoncini Gallery, Luxembourg
Myth in Modern  Times (Marsha Child, curator), Riverrun Gallery, New Jersey USA
Trajectes I Convergencies, Jardi Botanic, Cap Roig, Spain
Trajectes I Convergencies, Tecla Sala, L'Hospitalet, Spain
Trajectes I Convergencies, Sala Gaspar, Barcelona, Spain

1996
Memoire des Pierres,  Montauban, France
Traversée des dimentions, Abbaye de Lagrasse, France
7 sculpteurs, Michelle Guerin Gallery, Limetz, France
Group show, Simoncini Gallery,  Luxembourg

1997
3 artistes, Mic'Art Gallery, Lille, France
Trajectes I Convergencies, Vitoria Gasteis, Spain
Saga Art Fair, Gallery Michelle Guerin, Paris, France
Hualien Stone Show, Hualien, Taiwan
Three Artists, Les Punxes Gallery, Barcelona, Spain
Two Artists, 141 Gallery, Nagoya, Japan
Artists of the Gallery, Vitoux Gallery, Paris, France

1998
Bras d'honneur, Gerard  Laubie Gallery, Massillargue, France
Group show, Vitoux Gallery, Paris, France
Marbeilla Art Fair, Pilar Riberaygua Gallery, Spain
Estampa Art Fair, Michele Guerin Gallery, Madrid, Spain

1999
Stone Sculptures, Hualien Cultural Center Gallery, Hualien, Taiwan
Group show, Vitoux Gallery, Paris, France
Journée du Patrimoine, Carcassonne, France

2000
"20 sculptors", Les Punxes Gallery, Barcelona, Spain
Artexpo Fair, Maria Villalba Gallery, Barcelona, Spain
Group show, Girona Cathedral Garden
Garden Sculptures. Michele Guerin Gallery. Limetz, France
15 Artists from the East, Mode Expression Gallery, Perpignan, France
Estampa Art Fair, Art Estampa Gallery, Madrid, Spain
Sculptors of the Gallery, Vitoux Gallery, Paris

2001
France/Israel, Espace des Blanc, Manteaux, Paris, France
The White and the Black, Michele Guerin Gallery, Limetz, France
Artexpo Fair, Gallery Maria Villalba, Barcelona, Spain
Artists of the Gallery, Vitoux Gallery, Paris, France
Dearte art fair, Gallery Maria Villalba, Madrid, Spain
Rencontre Européene de Sculpture, Montauban, France

2002
Art Fair ARTEXPO, Gallery Maria Villalba, Barcelona, Spain
Mode d'Expression Gallery, Perpignan, France
La Maison du Chevalier Gallery, Carcassonne, France

2003
ST'ART, Strasbourg Art Fair, Gallery Maria Villalba, Strasbourg, France
10 years, Michele Guerin Gallery, Limetz, France
Garden sculptures, Michelle Guerin Gallery, Limetz, France
Space 21 Museum, Matsuyama, Japan

2004
ST'ART, Strasbourg Art Fair, Gallery Maria Villalba, Strasbourg, France
Miami Art Fair, Gallery Maria Villalba, Miami, Florida USA
Five Sculptors, Kraft Lieberman Gallery, Chicago, Illinois USA
Garden sculpture, Verhage Gallery, Ploegsteert,  Belgium
4 Artistes, Palais des congres, Perpignan, France
Toy Sculptures, Kraft Lieberman Gallery, Chicago, Illinois USA

2005
Perpignan Cathedral,  2-person show, Gallery Roger Castan, Perpignan, France
Le Puget castel group show, Triskel Gallery, Alzonne, France
Group show, Gallery Maria Villalba, Barcelona, Spain

2006
Karlsruhe art fair, Gallery Michel Guerin, Karlsruhe, Germany
Campo Santo garden show, Roger Castan Gallery, Perpignan, France
Group show, Gallery Maria Villalba, Barcelona, Spain
Group show, Kraft Lieberman Gallery, Chicago, Illinois USA

2007
Art Madrid, Art Fair, Gallery Villalba, Madrid, Spain

Monumental Open-Air Sculptures

1987 - Sculpture (1%), Les Aunettes, Évry III, Versailles, Paris, France

1988 - Monumental Sculptures Park, Sculpture Symposium, Gueugnon, France

1990 - UCCOAR, Samary Park, Sculpture International Symposium

1991 - Lavelanet museum, Sculpture Symposium

1993 - International Sculpture Symposia, Carcassonne and Auxerre, France

1994 - Taichung Fine Arts Museum, Taichung, Taiwan

1997 - 1998 Andorra Sculpture Park, Escaldes, Andorra

1999 - Hualien Cultural Center Symposium. Hualien, Taiwan

2002
Between Sky and Earth, Taipei 101, Taipei, Taiwan
Between Two Mountains, Montbel, France

2004 - Fountain for the City of Chalabre, France

2006 -Mosan Symposium, Korea

2007 - Tudela de Duero symposium, Spain

Collections

Long Beach Art Association, New York, New York USA
Bibliothèque nationale de Paris, France
Raychem Collection, Paris, France
Musée de l'Art Contemporain, Chamalières, France
Government of Andorra
Taichung Fine Arts Museum and Taipei Fine Arts Museum, Taiwan

See also
Axis mundi

References

Biography, Ariel Moscovici official site. Retrieved 2008-04-02.
Ariel Moscovici. Artistic statement. Supplied by the sculptor to Alton Thompson, March 2008.
Printed catalogue, Ariel Moscovici Sculptures, Chateau Le Puget Art Gallery, Alzonne 11170. France, 2007.

External links 
 Official Site: Ariel Moscovici
 Official Site: Sylvie Rivillon
 L'École Nationale Supérieure des Beaux-Arts (ENSBA)

1956 births
Living people
20th-century French sculptors
French male sculptors
21st-century French sculptors
21st-century French male artists
Artists from Bucharest
Romanian sculptors
Romanian Jews
Romanian emigrants to France